Senator Suazo may refer to:

Alicia Suazo (fl. 1990s–2000s), Utah State Senate
Pete Suazo (died 2001), Utah State Senate